Saint-Simon-les-Mines is a municipality in the Municipalité régionale de comté de Beauce-Sartigan in Quebec, Canada. It is part of the Chaudière-Appalaches region and the population is 549 as of 2016. It is named after Simon the Zealot, one of Jesus' apostles, while "les Mines" refers to a small gold mine that was discovered and exploited in the mid-nineteenth century.

References

Commission de toponymie du Québec
Ministère des Affaires municipales, des Régions et de l'Occupation du territoire

Municipalities in Quebec
Incorporated places in Chaudière-Appalaches